The Women's singles competition at the 2019 FIL European Luge Championships was held on 10 February 2019.

Results
The first run was held at 09:00 and the second run at 10:25.

References

Women's singles